Livadeia Province was one of the provinces of the Boeotia Prefecture, Greece. Its territory corresponded with that of the current municipalities Aliartos (except the municipal unit Thespies), Distomo-Arachova-Antikyra, Livadeia, and Orchomenos (except the municipal unit Akraifnia). It was abolished in 2006.

References

Provinces of Greece
Boeotia